Alloiodoris is a genus of sea slugs, specifically dorid nudibranchs. They are marine gastropod molluscs in the family Discodorididae. Alloiodoris species are found in the Southern Hemisphere, in South Africa, Australia and New Zealand.

Species
Species so far described in this genus include:

Alloiodoris marmorata  Bergh, 1904
Alloiodoris inhacae O'Donoghue, 1929
Alloiodoris lanuginata (Abraham, 1877)

Synonyms
 Alloiodoris hedleyi is a synonym of Sebadoris fragilis
 Alloiodoris nivosus is a synonym of Paradoris dubia

References

Discodorididae